The 2004 Champ Car Grand Prix of Portland was the fourth round of the 2004 Bridgestone Presents the Champ Car World Series Powered by Ford season, held on June 20, 2004 at Portland International Raceway in Portland, Oregon.  Sébastien Bourdais took the pole and race win.

Qualifying results

Race

Caution flags

Notes 

 New Race Record Sébastien Bourdais 1:45:50.461
 Average Speed 104.923 mph

Championship standings after the race

Drivers' Championship standings

 Note: Only the top five positions are included.

References

External links
 Full Weekend Times & Results
 Friday Qualifying Results
 Saturday Qualifying Results
 Race Box Score

Portland
2004 in Portland, Oregon
Champ Car Grand Prix
Grand Prix of Portland